The National Party of Scotland (NPS) was a centre-left political party in Scotland which was one of the predecessors of the current Scottish National Party (SNP). The NPS was the first Scottish nationalist political party, and the first which campaigned for Scottish self-determination.

The National Party of Scotland was founded in 1928 by the amalgamation of the Scots National League (SNL), the Scottish National Movement (SNM) and the Glasgow University Scottish Nationalist Association (GUSNA). The NPS emerged from the consensus among members of these groups, and the Scottish Home Rule Association, that an independent political party, free of any connections to any existing parties, was the best way forward for achieving Scottish Home Rule.

The NPS contested the 1929 and 1931 United Kingdom general elections, and a number of by-elections. In 1934 the NPS merged with the Scottish Party to form the Scottish National Party (SNP).

Origins and history
The NPS was formed in 1928 after John MacCormick of the Glasgow University Scottish Nationalist Association called a meeting of all those favouring the establishment of a party favouring Scottish Home Rule. The meeting was presided over by Robert Bontine Cunninghame Graham, who had been a Liberal Party, then Scottish Labour Party politician.  The NPS was formed by the amalgamation of GUSNA with the Scots National League, Lewis Spence's Scots National Movement and the Scottish Home Rule Movement. On 23 June an inauguration took place in Stirling.

The NPS was a left-of-centre party. The celebrated poet, Hugh MacDiarmid was a member, but was expelled on account of his communist views (ironically, he would later be expelled from the Communist Party of Great Britain for his Scottish Nationalist beliefs). Other figures besides MacDiarmid were involved. Eric Linklater stood as an NPS candidate in the 1933 East Fife by-election, and Neil Gunn played a role in aiding the NPS amalgamation with the Scottish Party.

Merger
In 1932 a home rule organisation, the Scottish Party, was formed by former members of the then Unionist Party, precursor of the modern Scottish Conservative and Unionist Party.  MacCormick desired unity amongst the Scottish Nationalist movement and made contact with the Scottish Party.  Increasingly the two parties began to co-operate, and when the Scottish Party chose to contest the Kilmarnock by-election in November 1933 the NPS endorsed their candidate.  In 1934 the NPS and Scottish Party merged to form the Scottish National Party.

Leaders of the National Party of Scotland

 Roland Muirhead, (1928–1932?)

Electoral performance
Lewis Spence was the first nationalist to stand for election. He contested Midlothian and Peebles Northern at a by-election in 1929 and came fourth, with 4.5% of the vote.

The NPS contested many elections in its short existence but never managed to get any of its candidates elected to parliament.

By-elections, 1929

1929 general election

By-elections, 1929-1931

1931 general election

By-elections, 1931-1933

Further reading
 Brand, Jack, The National Movement in Scotland, Routledge and Kegan Paul, 1978
 Brand, Jack, ‘Scotland’, in Watson, Michael (ed.), Contemporary Minority Nationalism, Routledge, 1990
 Richard J. Finlay, Independent and Free: Scottish Politics and the Origins of the Scottish National Party 1918-1945, John Donald Publishers, 1994
 Hanham, H.J., Scottish Nationalism, Harvard University Press, 1969
 Christopher Harvie, Scotland and Nationalism: Scottish Society and Politics 1707 to the Present, Routledge (4th edition), 2004
 Gerry Hassan (ed.), The Modern SNP: From Protest to Power, Edinburgh University Press, 2009, 
 Lloyd-Jones, N., "Liberalism, Scottish Nationalism and the Home Rule crisis, c.1886-1893", "English Historical Review" (August 2014)
 Lynch, Peter, SNP: The History of the Scottish National Party, Welsh Academic Press, 2002
 John MacCormick, The Flag in the Wind: The Story of the National Movement in Scotland, Victor Gollancz Ltd, 1955
 Mitchell, James, The Scottish Question, Oxford University Press, 2014

References

Collection of material relating to the Scottish National Party at The Archives Hub

Defunct political parties in Scotland
Political history of Scotland
Political parties established in 1928
Political parties disestablished in 1934
Scottish National Party
1928 establishments in Scotland
1934 disestablishments in Scotland
Scottish nationalist parties